Professor Minerva McGonagall is a fictional character in J. K. Rowling's Harry Potter series. Professor McGonagall is a professor at Hogwarts School for Witchcraft and Wizardry, the head of Gryffindor House, the professor of Transfiguration,  the Deputy Headmistress under Albus Dumbledore and a member of the Order of the Phoenix. Following Lord Voldemort's defeat at the hands of her student Harry Potter and the deaths of Headmasters Albus Dumbledore and Severus Snape, McGonagall takes the position of Headmistress. McGonagall was originally portrayed in the film adaptations by actress Maggie Smith, and later by Fiona Glascott in the Fantastic Beasts prequel films The Crimes of Grindelwald and The Secrets of Dumbledore.

Fictional character biography

Education and employment at Hogwarts
Minerva McGonagall was born on 4 October in Scotland to Robert McGonagall and Isobel Ross. McGonagall was born a half-blood witch as her father was a Muggle and her mother a witch. McGonagall began her Hogwarts education at the age of eleven and was sorted into Gryffindor after being the longest ever Hatstall between Gryffindor and Ravenclaw. McGonagall became friends with Hufflepuff student and future colleague Pomona Sprout and gained a particular talent in the art of Transfiguration under the tutelage of then Transfiguration professor Albus Dumbledore. During this time, McGonagall managed to become an Animagus, taking the form of a tabby cat and filed her paperwork to be officially registered. McGonagall was also a skilled member of the Gryffindor Quidditch team. After graduation, McGonagall became an employee for the Ministry of Magic in the Department of Magical Law Enforcement where she met her husband, Elphinstone Urquart. McGonagall was offered a promotion but turned it down and applied to teach Transfiguration at Hogwarts under Dumbledore. During her employment at Hogwarts, McGonagall grew particularly close to Dumbledore and the two were near inseparable friends and colleagues, and he began to recognise her as one of his most trusted allies. Eventually, McGonagall became the Head of the Transfiguration Department as well as the Head of Gryffindor House. After Headmaster Armando Dippet's retirement and Dumbledore's appointment as Headmaster, McGonagall became his Deputy Headmistress. Despite being a crucial force during the First Wizarding War against Lord Voldemort, McGonagall was not a member of the initial forming of the Order of the Phoenix. During the war, McGonagall lost her brother, Robert Jr, and two of her favourite students, James and Lily Potter. Following the death of the Potters and the first downfall of Voldemort, McGonagall accompanied Dumbledore and Rubeus Hagrid in delivering the sole survivor of the encounter, Harry Potter, to his aunt and uncle Petunia and Vernon Dursley in Surrey. Despite McGonagall's reservations that the Dursleys were the "worst kind of Muggles", she understood that due to the framing and imprisonment of Harry's godfather Sirius Black, the Dursleys were the only family the infant had left. After the war, McGonagall and Elphinstone married, but three years later he died from a Venomous Tentacula bite, making Minerva a widow.

Harry Potter and the Philosopher's Stone
In 1991, Dumbledore revealed to his closest colleagues and allies that he would be keeping the philosopher's stone that was keeping Nicholas Flamel alive at Hogwarts, and tasked each of his colleagues to devise protection for the stone. McGonagall's protection was a life-sized enchanted game of Wizard's Chess. That year, Harry Potter began his first year of education at Hogwarts and was sorted into Gryffindor, placing him in the care of McGonagall. After noticing Potter's flying skills whilst retrieving Neville Longbottom's Remembrall from Draco Malfoy, McGonagall quickly introduced Potter to Quidditch captain Oliver Wood, claiming to have found the new Seeker for the team. Harry made the Quidditch team, becoming the youngest Seeker in history. To ensure Potter had his broom, McGonagall bought Harry a Nimbus 2000 broomstick, which was the fastest broom at the time. During the Halloween feast, Defence Against the Dark Arts teacher Quirinus Quirrell interrupted warning everyone of a mountain troll in the dungeon. Dumbledore ordered the students to return to their dormitories whilst he and the teachers headed toward the dungeons. The troll was not in the dungeon, but the teachers noticed a racket from the upper floor. They arrived upon the scene where the girls' lavatories had been wrecked and the troll defeated by Harry and Ron Weasley while saving their friend Hermione Granger. Hermione took the blame for her friends claiming that she had gone looking for the troll but would have been killed if it weren't for Harry and Ron. McGonagall took five points away from Hermione but gave five points each to Harry and Ron for "sheer dumb luck". Later on in the year, McGonagall caught Draco Malfoy roaming the castle after hours. Malfoy claimed to have seen Harry at Hagrid's with an illegal baby dragon. Meanwhile, Hermione and Neville were caught by the groundskeeper Argus Filch and all of them were sentenced to detention. Towards the end of the year, it was revealed that Professor Quirrell was attached to Lord Voldemort and was the one attempting to steal the philosopher's stone, but was stopped by Harry, Ron, and Hermione. Due to the trio's bravery as well as Neville Longbottom's courage in attempting to stand up to them for breaking the rules, Gryffindor eventually won the House Cup that year.

Harry Potter and the Chamber of Secrets
The following school year began with McGonagall having to deal with Harry and Ron crashing Arthur Weasley's flying Ford Anglia into the Whomping Willow after they were unable to access Platform 9 3/4 and missed the Hogwarts Express, and nearly exposing the wizarding world to the Muggle populace. McGonagall was fairer than Slytherin Head and Potions master Severus Snape in punishing Harry and Ron, and instead assigned them to a detention rather than expelling them. Later that year, it was revealed that the Chamber of Secrets had been opened, which led to the petrifications of two of her students in her house, Hermione Granger and Colin Creevey, as both were Muggle-born. Towards the end of the year McGonagall was forced to act as temporary Headmistress after the Ministry of Magic suspended Dumbledore. Finally, she discovered another note from the Heir of Slytherin which stated that he had taken Ginny Weasley into the Chamber. McGonagall believed that this would be the end of Hogwarts, and forced the new Defence Against the Dark Arts professor Gilderoy Lockhart to find the Chamber of Secrets and rescue Ginny, pointing out all of Lockhart's supposed heroic acts. Ginny was saved by Harry and Ron after they descended into the Chamber of Secrets (which was located in a cavern under one of the girls' lavatories). Harry defeated the Basilisk with help from Dumbledore's pet phoenix, Fawkes, who delivered Harry the Sword of Godric Gryffindor. During this encounter, Harry unknowingly destroyed the first of Voldemort's Horcruxes by destroying Tom Riddle's diary with a Basilisk's fang. With the monster defeated and the Chamber of Secrets closed, Dumbledore was reinstated and assigned McGonagall to prepare a celebratory feast.

Harry Potter and the Prisoner of Azkaban
At the beginning of this school year, McGonagall assigned Hermione a Time-Turner to allow her to take multiple classes at the same time. After Azkaban escapee Sirius Black infiltrated the Castle, he was able to enter the Gryffindor common room. Black was apparently able to get in due to a list of passwords written down by Neville due to his constant forgetfulness. After a Dementor attack that caused Harry's Nimbus 2000 to be destroyed, Harry was sent a Firebolt. However, McGonagall confiscated it assuming it was sent by Sirius and cursed. However, the broomstick was returned to Harry after being declared safe. That year McGonagall watched as her house won their first Quidditch Cup in years, which resulted in McGonagall openly crying tears of joy.

Harry Potter and the Goblet of Fire
During this school year, it was announced that Hogwarts would be hosting the Triwizard Tournament as well as providing accommodation for the wizarding schools Beauxbatons and Durmstrang. Harry was chosen as a Triwizard Champion despite being underage and underequipped. McGonagall worried for the safety of her student and pleaded with Dumbledore and Ministry representative Barty Crouch Sr to remove Harry from the tournament to no avail. McGonagall would lend her classroom to Harry, Ron and Hermione to practice for the third and final task of the championship. After the end of the championship and the death of Cedric Diggory, McGonagall accompanied Dumbledore and Snape rescuing Harry from Death Eater Barty Crouch Jr, who had been masquerading as new Defence Against the Dark Arts professor Alastor "Mad-Eye" Moody as a part of the plan to resurrect Lord Voldemort. It was revealed that Crouch had placed Harry's name into the Goblet of Fire and bewitched it to force Harry into participation in the tournament. Due to this, Crouch was able to transform the Triwizard Cup into a Portkey to transport Harry to the graveyard in Little Hangleton where his blood could be used to resurrect Voldemort. McGonagall was instructed to guard Crouch, but was unable to prevent the Dementor sent by Minister for Magic Cornelius Fudge to kill Crouch in an attempt to stop mass hysteria over the return of Lord Voldemort. The Ministry began a smear campaign against Harry and Dumbledore and silenced any rumours that the Dark Lord had returned and downplayed the death of Cedric Diggory as a result.

Harry Potter and the Order of the Phoenix
Due to Voldemort's return, McGonagall finally joined the re-formed Order of the Phoenix alongside colleagues Dumbledore, Snape and Hagrid, as well as former colleagues Remus Lupin and Alastor Moody. Upon returning to Hogwarts, McGonagall was faced with the challenges of Ministry-appointed Defence Against the Dark Arts teacher, Dolores Umbridge. McGonagall was unafraid to show her disgust and hatred of Umbridge and her methods. Umbridge began to take control over the school, and appointed herself as "High Inquisitor". McGonagall was supportive of Harry, Ron and Hermione's formation of Dumbledore's Army in an attempt to teach the students how to defend themselves, considering Umbridge's refusal to do so. Due to Dumbledore's absence, Umbridge appointed herself as Headmistress rather than McGonagall. While Umbridge invaded the career advising sessions, McGonagall finally lost her temper at Umbridge after she kept interrupting Harry stating that he will never be an Auror for the Ministry of Magic. McGonagall pulled Harry aside and told him that she will assist Harry in achieving his goal of becoming an Auror even if it was the last thing she ever did. Whilst attempting to protect Hagrid from being sacked by Umbridge, McGonagall was attacked by Umbridge's Aurors and was sent to St Mungo's Hospital for Magical Maladies and Injuries. McGonagall was unable to return to Hogwarts until after the Battle of the Department of Mysteries, where Voldemort's return was revealed to the world. McGonagall awarded fifty points each to all six students present at the battle, Harry, Ron, Hermione, Neville, Ginny and Ravenclaw student Luna Lovegood for alerting the world of Voldemort's return. McGonagall was present when Umbridge was forcibly removed from Hogwarts grounds, stating that she would have joined Peeves the poltergeist in chasing Umbridge off if her injuries had not prevented her from doing so.

Harry Potter and the Half-Blood Prince
McGonagall was one of the first people Harry, Ron and Hermione turned to after Katie Bell was cursed. McGonagall called upon Snape and Filch to investigate the necklace she touched that caused her to be cursed. Snape stopped the curse from spreading and Harry professed his theory that Draco Malfoy was responsible. However, his theory was dismissed. Later in the year, McGonagall duelled with Death Eater Alecto Carrow during the Battle in the Astronomy Tower and later learned of Snape's murder of Dumbledore. McGonagall was initially appointed as Headmistress, but was demoted after Voldemort took control of the school and placed Snape as Headmaster.

Harry Potter and the Deathly Hallows
Despite the school being overrun by Death Eaters, McGonagall remained at Hogwarts to ensure little harm came to the students. Later during the year, McGonagall was present when Harry, Ron and Hermione returned to Hogwarts searching for Rowena Ravenclaw's diadem. She found Amycus Carrow attempting to break into Ravenclaw Tower, claiming his sister Alecto was inside. McGonagall opened the common room and found Alecto unconscious. Amycus revealed that he had been warned Harry would try to break into Ravenclaw Tower and admitted he would project the blame onto the students in the dormitories. When McGonagall refused and Amycus spat in her face, Harry angrily revealed himself and incapacitated the siblings with help from Luna. McGonagall then defeated Severus Snape and banished him from Hogwarts and began to defend the school. She tasked Neville and Seamus to destroy the wooden bridge to prevent Snatchers from sneaking into the school. McGonagall helped evacuate the younger students to Hogsmeade and ordered Pansy Parkinson and all those in favour of giving Harry over to Voldemort in exchange for their lives to leave. She was present to watch Harry defeat Voldemort once and for all and was one of the first people, aside from Ron, Hermione and Ginny, to congratulate him.

Epilogue
After the war ended, McGonagall was fully instated as the Headmistress of Hogwarts and was awarded the Order of Merlin, First Class by new Minister for Magic Kingsley Shacklebolt. McGonagall eventually hired Neville as the new Herbology professor due to his gifts in the subject, and elected him as the new Head of Gryffindor House. McGonagall later learned that Snape was secretly Harry's protector and had killed Dumbledore at Dumbledore’s request. McGonagall then made a controversial decision to add Snape's portrait in the Headmaster's Office as a testament to his bravery.

Characterisation and abilities
McGonagall is considered to be a formidable witch who is skilled in many forms of magic, notably transfiguration and spell-casting. She is able to perform certain magic without casting spells or sometimes without the use of a wand. McGonagall is a registered Animagus and can transform herself into a tabby cat at will. McGonagall was always held in high respect by her peers and students at Hogwarts and commanded a position second only to Dumbledore. She was notable for her sternness and dry sense of humour. Furthermore, Minerva McGonagall was inspired by the Roman goddess, Minerva or Athena in Greek mythology. Minerva was the goddess of wisdom and war (particularly in defensive war). During the series, Professor McGonagall displays many traits similar to the Roman goddess. For example, in the Deathly Hallows Part II, McGonagall directs and orders vital defensive tactics before the penultimate battle against Voldemort.

Reception
IGN ranked McGonagall as the 18th-best character in the franchise stating, "As the head of Gryffindor house and Deputy Headmistress of Hogwarts, Professor McGonagall can be a strict disciplinarian. She is quick to kick misbehaving students out of her class, and deduct house points when the situation warrants. But she can also be kind of like that cool aunt of yours -- the one who sometimes lets you get away with a bit of mischief. And that's what's so endearing about McGonagall." 

WatchMojo ranked McGonagall as their ninth-best character, stating, "Professor of Transfiguration at Hogwarts, Gryffindor head of house and member of the Order of the Phoenix, Professor McGonagall is an austere, imposing woman with a strict sense of responsibility. She keeps her students in line with the threat of detention, but also has a softer side on rare occasions – and not just when she transforms herself into a cat. When push comes to shove, Minerva McGonagall is a formidable witch with powerful magical abilities, even facing Voldemort himself at the Battle of Hogwarts." Maggie Smith also received much praise for her interpretation of the character, with author J.K. Rowling stating that she had always pictured the actress in the role of McGonagall. Despite this, Smith stated that she didn't feel wholly comfortable while making the films and that "it didn't really feel like acting", but has said that she enjoyed being a part of the franchise as it gives her something to bond with her grandchildren over. In 2007, Smith was diagnosed with breast cancer and struggled during the filming of Harry Potter and the Half-Blood Prince, but made a full recovery in 2009. McGonagall's inclusion in Fantastic Beasts: The Crimes of Grindelwald was controversial for some fans of the series, as the character had been believed not to be born yet and was shown in the film teaching at Hogwarts.

References

Harry Potter characters
Fantastic Beasts characters
Literary characters introduced in 1997
Film characters introduced in 2001
Fictional characters who can morph animal or plant forms
Fictional principals and headteachers
Fictional members of secret societies
Fictional government agents
Fictional schoolteachers
Fictional professors
Female characters in literature
Female characters in film
Fictional war veterans
Fictional witches
Fictional Scottish people